Effleurage, a French word meaning "to skim" or "to touch lightly on", is a series of massage strokes used in Swedish massage to warm up the muscle before deep tissue work using petrissage.

This is a soothing, stroking movement used at the beginning and the end of the facial and/or body massage. It is also used as a linking move between the different strokes and movements. Effleurage is basically a form of massage involving a circular stroking movement made with the palm of the hand.

Effleurage can be firm or light without dragging the skin, and is performed using either the padded parts of the finger tips or the palmar surface of the hands. Lotion may or may not be used. The process works as a mechanical pump on the body to encourage venous and lymphatic return by starting at the bottom of the limb and pushing back towards the heart. This will have more success with this once all the muscles in the area are warmed up and loose. It consists of four sub-categories:

 Ethereal or aura strokes
 Feathering, or nerve-stroking
 Superficial effleurage
 Deeper effleurage

See also 
 Massage
 Gua sha
 Petrissage
 Tapotement

References

Manual therapy